Louis Weiss (December 21, 1890 – December 14, 1963, Los Angeles) was an American independent producer of low-budget comedies, westerns, serials, and exploitation films.

Early life
Louis Weiss was born in New York City and left school after third grade (elementary school), according to the 1940 US Census. In 1907 he established a nickelodeon theater, launching a lifelong enthusiasm for motion pictures. In the 1920s he joined with his brothers Adolph and Max to form the Weiss Brothers production company, with money earned from a New York lamp-and-fixture store, phonograph sales, and ownership of a theater that developed into a small chain.

Silent films

Most of the Weiss productions were never reviewed or copyrighted, apparently deliberately avoiding press attention. The only record of their existence is found in an occasional release chart, a few advertisements and surviving prints. Though most Poverty Row producers averaged a six-reel length, or about 60 minutes, Weiss continually tried to pare that down to five reels, lasting just over 50 minutes.

A successful early Weiss film was The Revenge of Tarzan (1920), followed the next year by The Adventures of Tarzan.

Like other smaller studios, the Weiss Brothers tried to compete with big-studio movies whenever possible. In 1926 Weiss signed former Hal Roach star Snub Pollard for a series of short comedies. These started as solo vehicles for Pollard, but soon devolved into imitations of the then-new comedy team of Laurel and Hardy, with Pollard in the sad-faced Laurel role and Marvin Loback as an approximation of Hardy. Although filmed on low budgets, the Pollard shorts were popular enough to continue into 1929, and they boosted the Weiss Brothers' standing among comedy producers. This marked a period of ambition and expansion for the Weiss Brothers. They signed a major star, the cross-eyed Mack Sennett comic Ben Turpin, to star in two-reel comedies; then hired circus acrobat Poodles Hanneford for a series of shorts; and added new series with comic characters Hairbreadth Harry (played by Earl Montgomery); Winnie Winkle (played by Ethelyn Gibson); and Izzie and Lizzie (played by Georgie Chapman and Bess True). These films were all released to theaters under the Artclass trademark ("The Sign of a Good Picture").

The Weiss Brothers' advancing progress of the late 1920s came to a screeching halt with the coming of sound to motion pictures, and the stock market crash of 1929. The silent Weiss product had been cheap to begin with -- much of it photographed outdoors to avoid building sets -- and sound would only add to the expense. When much of the brothers' producing capital was wiped out by Wall Street, they could only afford to make occasional films themselves, and would acquire the already completed films of other shoestring producers.

Serials
The Weiss Brothers' fortunes took an upturn when they entered the field of adventure serials in 1935. Under the corporate name of Stage and Screen Productions, the brothers announced three promising cliffhangers: Custer's Last Stand (relying heavily on footage from the Weiss Brothers' silent Custer's Last Fight), The Clutching Hand, and The Black Coin. The Custer serial attracted the most attention, being the brothers' initial serial effort, but all three serials did well on the independent market. Film archivist Kit Parker, who handles the Weiss Brothers library for home video, notes that the Weiss salary scale for these serials was incredibly low: female lead Ruth Mix was paid only $3.75 per day.

When Columbia Pictures decided to enter the serial field in 1937, the studio found it quicker and easier to hire a serial unit that was already functioning. Thus the Weiss Brothers found themselves now making serials for Columbia release. That year's three Weiss serials were Jungle Menace starring animal trainer Frank Buck; The Mysterious Pilot with flying ace Frank Hawks; and The Secret of Treasure Island with Columbia's action star Don Terry. The Weiss serials were very successful, attracting more than the typical number of juvenile audiences for their 15 weekly chapters, and establishing Columbia as a worthy competitor in the serial field. Columbia then took over serial production itself, where it would remain active through the death of the form in 1956. The Weiss Brothers returned to the lower ranks of independent productions.

Exploitation films
Through the 1940s and into the 1950s, Louis Weiss and his son Adrian Weiss specialized in exploitation fare: cheap thrills for undemanding audiences. Their usual choice of director was Harry Fraser, a silent-era veteran who was noted for making his films look more elaborate than their low budgets allowed. Fraser recalled in his memoirs that Louis Weiss urgently needed "a gorilla picture" for the action trade, and Fraser wrote and directed The White Gorilla, which he frankly admitted was pure hokum. True to the Weiss tradition of cutting costs, much of the action was taken from the 1921 Artclass silent The Adventures of Tarzan. The White Gorilla was successful for both Weiss and Fraser, and the two remained friends and colleagues through 1951, when they made an exploitation picture about the love life of Siamese twins:Chained for Life starred real-life Siamese twins Daisy and Violet Hilton.

Final years
The Weiss production company was among the first to make its film library available to television; its silent comedies were first revived in 1947. Returning to their story property from the 1934 serial The Clutching Hand, Louis and Adrian Weiss produced the early TV series Craig Kennedy, Criminologist, starring veteran screen actor Donald Woods. The Weiss company discontinued further production and managed its film library for the rest of its existence.

References

Bibliography

External links

Weiss Bros. – Artclass and Beyond – The Sound Era

American film producers
1890 births
1963 deaths
American Jews
Defunct American film studios